Zdravko Miljak (born 11 September 1950) is a Croatian handball player who competed for Yugoslavia  in the 1972 Summer Olympics and in the 1976 Summer Olympics.

He was born in Vinkovci, SR Croatia, Yugoslavia.

In 1972 he was part of the Yugoslav team which won the gold medal at the Munich Games. He played all six matches and scored seven goals.

Four years later he was a member of the Yugoslav team which finished fifth in the Olympic tournament. He played all six matches and scored 30 goals.

External links
 profile

1950 births
Living people
Croatian male handball players
Yugoslav male handball players
Olympic handball players of Yugoslavia
Handball players at the 1972 Summer Olympics
Handball players at the 1976 Summer Olympics
Olympic gold medalists for Yugoslavia
Olympic medalists in handball
Medalists at the 1972 Summer Olympics
Croatian handball coaches